Roles is a surname. Notable people with the surname include:

 Albie Roles (1921–2012), English footballer
 Barbara Roles (born 1941), American figure skater
 Jack Roles (born 1999), English footballer
 Natalie Roles (born 1968), former English actress

See also
 Role (sociology term)
 Role (disambiguation)
 Roles or Rholes, Getae chieftain in Scythia Minor
 Rolesville, North Carolina, named after William H. Roles